Peter Engel (born ) is an American television producer who is best known for his teen sitcoms that appeared on TNBC, a former Saturday morning block on NBC which featured all teenage-oriented programs for educational purposes.  His most well known work was the teen sitcom Saved by the Bell which inspired the birth of the TNBC block for his other shows such as California Dreams, Hang Time and City Guys in the 1990s.

Life and career

After producing teen-focused series for NBC, Engel transitioned to producing reality television series. A reality television project that Engel executive produced is the NBC reality series Last Comic Standing. He has been announced as executive producer and creator of the E! Network reality show Chasing The Saturdays, starring the British girl group The Saturdays.

Religiously, Engel was raised Jewish, and has converted to Christianity.

Engel released a memoir titled I Was Saved by the Bell: Stories of Life, Love, and Dreams That Do Come True.

Production filmography

 Good Morning, Miss Bliss (1988–1989)
 Saved by the Bell (1989–1993)
 California Dreams (1992–1996)
 Saved by the Bell: The College Years (1993–1994)
 Saved by the Bell: The New Class (1993–2000)
 Hang Time (1995–2000)
 USA High (1997–1999)
 City Guys (1997–2001)
 One World (1998–2001)
 Malibu, CA (1998–2000)
 All About Us (2001)

Associated production companies
 NBC Productions (1988–1996)
 NBC Studios (1996–2001)
 NBC Enterprises (1996–2001)

References

External links

Converts to Christianity from Judaism
American television producers
Living people
Regent University faculty
Place of birth missing (living people)
1936 births